Washington Street station may refer to:

 Washington Street station (Newark Light Rail) in Newark, New Jersey
 Washington Street station (San Diego Trolley) in San Diego, California
 Washington Street station (Illinois) in Grayslake, Illinois
 Washington/Wells station in Chicago, Illinois
 Washington Street station (MBTA) in Boston, Massachusetts

See also 
 Washington (MBTA station) (disambiguation)